The 1971 South Pacific Games was the 4th such event in which football was included, and was held in Tahiti during September 1971.

Group stage

Group 1

Group 2

Semi finals

5th place Match

Bronze medal match

Final Match

References

External links
Details on RSSSF website

Football at the Pacific Games
1971
Pac
P
1971 Pacific Games